Christine Maria Jasch (born 7 November 1960 in Vienna) is an Austrian economist, author and accountant.

Life and career 
Christine Jasch completed secondary school in Vienna, where she matriculated in 1979 to study at the University of Vienna's Department of Economics, and at the University of Natural Resources and Life Sciences, Vienna. In 1984 she applied for a Studium Irregulare for Ecological Economics. She became a certified public accountant in 1989 and lead verifier according to the EU EMAS Regulation in 1995. In 1989 she founded the Vienna Institute for Environmental Management and Economics, IÖW.  In 1999, she habilitated (qualified for professorship) in Environmental Management and Economics at the Austrian University for Agriculture.  
Since 2011 she has been responsible for the auditing of sustainability reports and certification of environmental management systems for Ernst & Young Climate Change and Sustainability Services, Vienna.

Research and teaching 
Jasch's work focuses on the combination of environmental and sustainability issues with economic instruments, including environmental cost accounting and sustainability reporting. Her IÖW work has included methodological development as well as practical implementation guidelines for environmental management tools.

Working areas include environmental performance evaluation and sustainability indicators, integrated information and management systems, environmental and sustainability accounting, material flow cost accounting, impact assessment, ISO standardization for environmental management, sustainability reporting, sustainable product service systems and socially responsible investing, cleaner technologies.

On behalf of the Austrian environmental ministry since 1993 she negotiated the ISO standards ISO 14001 environmental management systems, ISO 14031 Environmental Performance Evaluation and ISO 14041 Material Flow Cost Accounting.

In 2000, via the Sustainability Group of the Austrian Chamber for Accountants and Auditors, which she chairs, she founded the Austrian Sustainability Reporting Awards, ASRA, which are granted annually since in cooperation with partners.

From 2000 – 2006 she was member of the United Nations Working Group on Environmental Management Accounting. For them she wrote a book on principles and procedures for environmental management accounting, which was the basis for her later work on the IFAC Guidance document on environmental management accounting, released in 2005. UNIDO is using this approach to combine it with Cleaner Technologies and Environmental Management Systems and thus establish arguments and a baseline for environmental protection and related cost savings by improved resource efficiency. 
In Austria the national law for the implementation of the EU emission trading scheme requests a separately qualified accounting expert for data monitoring in the audit team, in addition to a process engineer and a chemist. Christine Jasch has qualified as such in 2005 and works on CO2 audits with TUEV Austria. In April 2008 she was voted into the board of directors of oekostrom AG where she served till 2013. 
Lecturing engagements exist or existed with the University of Natural Resources and Life Sciences, Vienna, the University of Klagenfurt, the University of Applied Sciences Wiener Neustadt Campus Wieselburg,  the University of Applied Sciences Kufstein, the University of Applied Sciences Technikum Wien, Vienna and the Danube University Krems.

Books
 "Environmental Management Accounting for Cleaner Production", Schaltegger, S., Bennett, M., Burritt, R.L., Jasch, C.M. (Eds.) Springer 2008, 
 "Life Cycle Design A Manual for Small and Medium-Sized Enterprises", Behrendt, S., Jasch, C., Peneda, M.C., Weenen, H. van (Eds.), Springer 1997,

References

External links 
 Ecologic Institut EU
 University of Natural Resources and Life Sciences, Vienna

Austrian economists
Austrian women economists
Writers from Vienna
1960 births
Living people
21st-century Austrian women writers